Alfred Songoro (born 10 January 1975) is a former professional rugby league footballer who played in the 1990s and 2000s. Songoro was a Brisbane Broncos junior, playing for their Colts side in 1993 and 1994. In 1994, he represented the Queensland Under 19 side.

International honours
Alfred Songoro won caps for Papua New Guinea in 2000 against Australia, in the 2000 World Cup against France, South Africa, Tonga, and Wales, and in 2001 against Australia.

References

External links
Rugby League World Cup 2000 - Team Profiles 
Guisset returns for France
Bennett plays the waiting game
Kumuls unchanged for Wales
Wales win sets up Aussie showdown

1975 births
Catalans Dragons players
Living people
Papua New Guinea national rugby league team players
Papua New Guinean rugby league players
Papua New Guinean sportsmen
Place of birth missing (living people)
Rugby league centres
Rugby league wingers
Wakefield Trinity players
Papua New Guinean expatriate rugby league players
Expatriate rugby league players in England
Expatriate rugby league players in France
Papua New Guinean expatriate sportspeople in the United Kingdom
Papua New Guinean expatriate sportspeople in France